Chahar Qeshlaq (also Romanized as Chahār Qeshlāq) is a village in Howmeh Rural District, in the Central District of Garmsar County, Semnan Province, Iran. At the 2006 census, its population was 51, in 16 families.

References 

Populated places in Garmsar County